Frederic Ogden Nash (August 19, 1902 – May 19, 1971) was an American poet well known for his light verse, of which he wrote over 500 pieces. With his unconventional rhyming schemes, he was declared by The New York Times the country's best-known producer of humorous poetry.

Early life
Nash was born in Rye, New York, the son of Mattie (Chenault) and Edmund Strudwick Nash. His father owned and operated an import–export company, and because of business obligations, the family often relocated. Nash was descended from Abner Nash, an early governor of North Carolina. The city of Nashville, Tennessee, was named after Abner's brother, Francis, a Revolutionary War general.

Throughout his life, Nash loved to rhyme. "I think in terms of rhyme, and have since I was six years old", he stated in a 1958 news interview. He had a fondness for crafting his own words whenever rhyming words did not exist but admitted that crafting rhymes was not always the easiest task.

His family lived briefly in Savannah, Georgia, in a carriage house owned by Juliette Gordon Low, the founder of the Girl Scouts of the USA. He wrote a poem about Mrs. Low's House. After graduating from St. George's School in Newport County, Rhode Island, Nash entered Harvard University in 1920, only to drop out a year later.

He returned as a teacher to St. George's for one year before he returned to New York. There, he took up selling bonds about which Nash reportedly quipped, "Came to New York to make my fortune as a bond salesman and in two years sold one bond—to my godmother. However, I saw lots of good movies." Nash then took a position as a writer of the streetcar card ads for Barron Collier, a company that had employed another Baltimore resident, F. Scott Fitzgerald. While working as an editor at Doubleday, he submitted some short rhymes to The New Yorker. The editor Harold Ross wrote Nash to ask for more: "They are about the most original stuff we have had lately." Nash spent three months in 1931 in working on the editorial staff for The New Yorker.

In 1931, he married Frances Leonard. He published his first collection of poems, Hard Lines, the same year, which earned him national recognition. Some of his poems reflected an anti-establishment feeling. For example, one verse, titled "Common Sense", asks:

In 1934, Nash moved to Baltimore, Maryland, where he remained until his death in 1971. Nash thought of Baltimore as home. After his return from a brief move to New York, he wrote, "I could have loved New York had I not loved Balti-more."

Writing career

When Nash was not writing poems, he made guest appearances on comedy and radio shows and toured the United States and the United Kingdom and gave lectures at colleges and universities.

Nash was regarded with respect by the literary establishment, and his poems were frequently anthologized even in serious collections like Selden Rodman's 1946 A New Anthology of Modern Poetry.

Nash was the lyricist for the Broadway musical One Touch of Venus and collaborated with the librettist S. J. Perelman and the composer Kurt Weill. The show included the notable song "Speak Low". He also wrote the lyrics for the 1952 revue Two's Company.

Nash and his love of the Baltimore Colts were featured in the December 13, 1968 issue of Life, with several poems about the American football team matched to full-page pictures. Entitled "My Colts, verses and reverses", the issue includes his poems and photographs by Arthur Rickerby: "Mr. Nash, the league leading writer of light verse (Averaging better than 6.3 lines per carry), lives in Baltimore and loves the Colts", it declares. The comments further describe Nash as "a fanatic of the Baltimore Colts, and a gentleman."  Featured on the magazine cover is the defensive player Dennis Gaubatz, number 53, in midair pursuit with this description:  "That is he, looming 10 feet tall or taller above the Steelers' signal caller ... Since Gaubatz acts like this on Sunday, I'll do my quarterbacking Monday." Memorable Colts Jimmy Orr, Billy Ray Smith, Bubba Smith, Willie Richardson, Dick Szymanski and Lou Michaels contribute to the poetry.

Among his most popular writings were a series of animal verses, many of which featured his off-kilter rhyming devices. Examples include "If called by a panther / Don't anther"; "Who wants my jellyfish? / I'm not sellyfish!"; "The one-L lama, he's a priest.  The two-L llama, he's a beast.  And I will bet a silk pajama: there isn't any three-L lllama!" Nash later appended the footnote "*The author's attention has been called to a type of conflagration known as a three-alarmer. Pooh."

The best of his work was published in 14 volumes between 1931 and 1972.

Poetic style
Nash was best known for surprising, pun-like rhymes, sometimes with words deliberately misspelled for comic effect, as in his retort to Dorothy Parker's humorous dictum, "Men seldom make passes / At girls who wear glasses":

In this example, the word "nectacled" sounds like the phrase "neck tickled" when rhymed with the previous line.

Sometimes the words rhyme by mispronunciation rather than misspelling, as in:

Another typical example of rhyming by combining words occurs in "The Adventures of Isabel", when Isabel confronts a witch who threatens to turn her into a toad:

Nash often wrote in an exaggerated verse form with pairs of lines that rhyme, but are of dissimilar length and irregular meter:

Nash's poetry was often a playful twist of an old saying or poem. For one example, in a twist on Joyce Kilmer's poem "Trees" (1913), which contains "I think that I shall never see / a poem lovely as a tree"; Nash adds, "Indeed, unless the billboards fall / I'll never see a tree at all."

Other poems
Nash, a baseball fan, wrote a poem titled "Line-Up for Yesterday", an alphabetical poem listing baseball immortals. Published in Sport in January 1949, the poem pays tribute to highly respected baseball players and to his own fandom, in alphabetical order. Lines include:

Nash wrote humorous poems for each movement of the Camille Saint-Saëns orchestral suite The Carnival of the Animals, which are sometimes recited when the work is performed. The original recording of this version was made by Columbia Records in the 1940s, with Noël Coward reciting the poems and Andre Kostelanetz conducting the orchestra.

He wrote a humorous poem about the IRS and income tax titled Song for the Saddest Ides, a reference to March 15, the ides of March, when federal taxes were due at the time.  It was later set to music and performed by the IRS Chorale until its composer/conductor's later retirement.

Many of his poems, reflecting the times in which they were written, presented stereotypes of different nationalities. For example, in "Genealogical Reflections" he writes:

In "The Japanese", published in 1938, Nash presents an allegory for the expansionist policies of the Empire of Japan:

He published some poems for children, including "The Adventures of Isabel", which begins:

Death
Nash died at Baltimore's Johns Hopkins Hospital on May 19, 1971, of heart failure 10 days after suffering a stroke while receiving treatment for kidney failure. He is buried in East Side Cemetery in North Hampton, New Hampshire.

At the time of his death in 1971, The New York Times said his "droll verse with its unconventional rhymes made him the country's best-known producer of humorous poetry."

Legacy

Musical
Nash at Nine, a Broadway musical that set some of Nash's poems as lyrics to music by Milton Rosenstock, premiered at the Helen Hayes Theatre on Broadway on May 17, 1973, and closed on June 2, 1973, after 5 previews and 21 performances. Directed by Martin Charnin, the show featured Steve Elmore, Bill Gerber, E.G. Marshall, Richie Schechtman, and Virginia Vestoff.

Postage stamp
The US Postal Service released a postage stamp featuring Ogden Nash and text from six of his poems on the centennial of his birth on August 19, 2002. The six poems are "The Turtle", "The Cow", "Crossing The Border", "The Kitten", "The Camel", and "Limerick One".  The stamp is the eighteenth in the Literary Arts section. The first issue ceremony took place in Baltimore on August 19 at the home that he and his wife Frances shared with his parents on 4300 Rugby Road, where he did most of his writing.

Biography
A biography, Ogden Nash: the Life and Work of America's Laureate of Light Verse, was written by Douglas M. Parker and published in 2005 and in paperback in 2007. Written with the cooperation of the Nash family, the book quotes extensively from Nash's personal correspondence as well as his poetry.

Family
Nash's daughter Isabel was married to noted photographer Frederick Eberstadt. His granddaughter, Fernanda Eberstadt, is an acclaimed author, and his grandson is political economist Nicholas Eberstadt. Nash had one other daughter, author Linell Nash Smith.

Bibliography 

 Hard Lines by Ogden Nash. Simon and Schuster, 1931. 
 I'm a Stranger Here Myself by Ogden Nash. Little Brown & Co, 1938 (reissued Buccaneer Books, 1994. )
 The Face Is Familiar: The Selected Verse of Ogden Nash by Ogden Nash. Garden City Publishing Company, Inc., 1941.
 Good Intentions by Ogden Nash. Little Brown & Co, 1942. 
 Many Long Years Ago by Ogden Nash. Little Brown & Co, 1945. ASIN B000OELG1O
 Versus by Ogden Nash. Little, Brown, & Co, 1949.
 Private Dining Room by Ogden Nash. Little Brown & Co, 1952. ASIN B000H1Z8U4
 The Moon Is Shining Bright As Day by Ogden Nash. J. B. Lippincott Co, 1953. 
 You Can't Get There from Here by Ogden Nash. Little Brown & Co, 1957.
 Everyone but Thee and Me by Ogden Nash. Boston : Little, Brown, 1962.
 Marriage Lines by Ogden Nash. Boston : Little, Brown, 1964.
 There's Always Another Windmill by Ogden Nash. Little Brown & Co, 1968. 
 Bed Riddance by Ogden Nash. Little Brown & Co, 1969. ASIN B000EGGXD8
 Collected Verse from 1929 On by Ogden Nash. Lowe & Brydone (Printers) Ltd., London, for J. M. Dent & Sons Ltd. 1972
 The Old Dog Barks Backwards by Ogden Nash. Little Brown & Co, 1972. 
 Custard and Company by Ogden Nash. Little Brown & Co, 1980. 
 Ogden Nash's Zoo by Ogden Nash and Étienne Delessert. Stewart, Tabori, and Chang, 1986. 
 Pocket Book of Ogden Nash by Ogden Nash. Pocket, 1990. 
 Candy Is Dandy by Ogden Nash, Anthony Burgess, Linell Smith, and Isabel Eberstadt. Carlton Books Ltd, 1994. 
 Selected Poetry of Ogden Nash by Ogden Nash. Black Dog & Levanthal Publishing, 1995. 
 The Tale of Custard the Dragon by Ogden Nash and Lynn Munsinger. Little, Brown Young Readers, 1998. 
 Custard the Dragon and the Wicked Knight by Ogden Nash and Lynn Munsinger. Little, Brown Young Readers, 1999. 

List of poems

References

External links
 
 
   Includes a list of over a hundred Ogden Nash poems. Most or all are under copyright and therefore not available online.
 
 Blogden Nash Catalogs the global reach and influence of Ogden Nash on contemporary life.
 Ogden Nash's Collection at the Harry Ransom Center at The University of Texas at Austin
 Performance of Vernon Duke's Musical Zoo, a setting of Ogden Nash verses to music
 Information Please episode 1939.01.17 with panelist Ogden Nash

1902 births
1971 deaths
People from Rye, New York
Harvard University alumni
American horror writers
American humorous poets
Ghost story writers
Writers from Baltimore
20th-century American poets
American copywriters
Deaths from Crohn's disease
St. George's School (Rhode Island) alumni
Poets from New York (state)
Members of the American Academy of Arts and Letters